Anderson Gustavo Torres (born in Brasília) is a Brazilian chief of police of the Federal Police, who served as Minister of Justice and Public Security under Jair Bolsonaro. Following the 2023 invasion of the Brazilian Congress, Torres' arrest was ordered by the Supreme Federal Court and he was subsequently arrested.

Early life and education
Torres holds a law degree from the Central University of Brasília, with a specialization in police science, criminal investigation and strategic intelligence at the Superior School of War. He was professor at the Civil Police Academy of Rondônia, Federal District Military Police Academy and the National Academy of Police.

Early career 
He was typistcopist at the Civil Police of the Federal District and is currently a police chief of the Federal Police. Coordinated the main investigations focused in the fight against the organized crime in the Superintendence of the Federal Police in Roraima, between 2003 and 2005. At the institution, he worked in Roraima and in operations at the Raposa Serra do Sol indigenous reserve, which arrested in 2008 the farmer Paulo César Quartiero, leader of the rice farmers of the regions.

In the Chamber of Deputies, Torres coordinated committees about subjects related to public security and fight against the organized crime, as well as he was chief of staff of deputy Fernando Francischini (PSL-PR).

From 2019 to 2021, he was State Secretary of Public Security of the Federal District, nominated by Governor Ibaneis Rocha.

Minister of Justice and Public Security 
On 29 March 2021, his nomination was announced by President Jair Bolsonaro for the office of Minister of Justice and Public Security. Torres was nominated and took office on the following day.

In April 2021, it was published that Torres filed his membership to the Social Liberal Party, aiming the 2022 elections and became President of the party in the Federal District. On January 2, 2023, Torres was, again, appointed as Secretary of Public Security of the Federal District.

2023 dismissal and arrest 
On January 8, 2023, Torres was dismissed from his position as Secretary of Public Security of the Federal District due to the events of the 2023 invasion of the Brazilian Congress. Furthermore, the Brazilian federal public defender submitted a request for his arrest due to his alleged inaction during the attack. The Supreme Court of Brazil issued an arrest warrant due to allegations of collusion with the rioters behind the attacks. Torres denied the allegations. On January 14, 2023, he was arrested upon his return to Brasília.

References

|-

1976 births
Living people
People from Brasília
Ministers of Justice of Brazil
Brazilian police officers
Brazil Union politicians
Social Liberal Party (Brazil) politicians
Prisoners and detainees of Brazil
20th-century Brazilian people
21st-century Brazilian politicians
Date of birth missing (living people)